Dale Crider (born c.1940) is a troubadour and former Florida Fish and Wildlife Conservation Commission biologist. He performed at the Florida Folklife Festival for several decades. He performed traditional bluegrass songs and in later years his original compositions. He sings about environmental themes.

He lives in Alachua County. He married Linda Bittner. They divorced and he remarried with Linda Crider, who is also his musical partner. He has six children, three from each marriage.

His song "Apalachicola Doin' Time" features in the similarly named documentary.

References

American folk guitarists
American folk singers
American bluegrass guitarists
People from Alachua County, Florida
Musicians from Florida
Year of birth uncertain
Living people